is a cavalier perspective maze game that was developed and released by Namco for arcades in 1987. In the game, the player controls Pac-Man as he must eat all of the dots while avoiding the colored ghosts that chase him in the maze. Eating large flashing "Power Pellets" will allow Pac-Man to eat the ghosts for bonus points, which lasts for a short period of time. A new feature to this game allows Pac-Man to jump over the ghosts to evade capture. It is the ninth title in the Pac-Man video game series and was the last one developed for arcades up until the release of Pac-Man Arrangement in 1996. Development was directed by Pac-Man creator Toru Iwatani. It was licensed to Atari Games for release in North America.

Pac-Mania gained a highly-positive critical reception for its uniqueness and gameplay. It was nominated for "Best Coin-Op Conversion of the Year" at the Golden Joystick Awards in 1987, although it lost to Taito's Operation Wolf. Pac-Mania was ported to several home consoles and computers, including the Atari ST, MSX2, Sega Genesis and Nintendo Entertainment System, the last of which being published by Tengen. Several Pac-Man and Namco video game collections also included the game. Ports for the Wii Virtual Console, iOS and mobile phones were also produced.

Gameplay

Pac-Mania is a maze game viewed from an oblique perspective and with a gameplay similar to the franchise's original installment. The player controls Pac-Man, a yellow circular creature that must eat all of the pellets in each stage while avoiding five colored ghosts named Blinky, Pinky, Inky, Clyde and Sue. Eating large Power Pellets will cause the ghosts to turn blue and flee, allowing Pac-Man to eat them for bonus points and send them to the house in the middle of the stage. Clearing the stage of dots and pellets will allow Pac-Man to move to the next.

New to this game is the ability to jump over the ghosts, allowing Pac-Man to evade capture. Later levels of the game introduce two new ghosts, Funky and Spunky, who also have the ability to jump while in Sandbox Land and Jungly Steps. While Pac-Man can still barely jump over Funky, it is impossible to jump over Spunky. Eating a certain number of pellets will cause a bonus item to appear in the middle of the stage, which Pac-Man can eat up for points. Some of these bonus items are called Special Items, which are items from later levels, or are Red and Green Power Pellets. Red Power Pellets double the point values of blue ghosts (this bonus is lost if Pac-Man loses a life), and Green Power Pellets temporarily increase Pac-Man's speed. If the player makes Pac-Man stay on the same stage for too long, his jump strength weakens until he cannot jump at all, making him unable to jump over Funky as well.

Ports
Pac-Mania arrived on all of the major 8- and 16-bit systems in Europe in 1988, which were Amiga and Atari ST in October, Commodore 64 later that year, and Amstrad CPC, MSX and ZX Spectrum in December. The conversions were designed and ported by Teque Software, then composed of the duo Peter Harrap and Shaun Hollingworth, and the games were published by Grandslam Entertainment. The same company developed an Acorn Archimedes port, which was published by Domark in 1991. Sharp Corporation developed and released the game for its X68000 in early 1989. Namco also released an MSX2 port of the game in mid-June that year.

Pac-Mania was later ported to the Nintendo Entertainment System in late 1990 and the Master System and Sega Genesis in 1991 by Tengen. All three were released in North America, with the Master System port published by TecMagik. The Genesis port was outsourced to Sculptured Software.

Reception

In Japan, Game Machine listed Pac-Mania on their December 15, 1987 issue as being the fifth most-successful table arcade unit of the month. In North America, Atari sold 1,412 arcade cabinets in 1987, earning about $2.82 million ($ million adjusted for inflation) in cabinet sales.

Entertainment Weekly gave the Genesis version a B− in 1991.

The game was runner-up in the category of Best Coin-Op Conversion of the Year at the Golden Joystick Awards, behind Operation Wolf.

Legacy
The arcade version of Pac-Mania appeared in Namco Museum Volume 5, the 2001 Namco Museum release, Namco Museum: 50th Anniversary and Namco Museum Virtual Arcade. In 2001, it was one of the games included in Pac-Man Collection for the Game Boy Advance. Later, in 2002, the arcade version was re-released and included as an unlockable bonus in Pac-Man World 2. In 2007, Pac-Mania was also released in Namco Museum Remix with Pac & Pal, Pac 'n Roll, Super Pac-Man and other non-Pac-Man games and was re-released in 2010 as part of the follow-up compilation Namco Museum Megamix, along with 17 other Namco arcade games and six remix games, five of which appeared in Namco Museum Remix.

In 2010, the design of Pac-Man and the ghosts from Pac-Mania appear in Pac-Man Championship Edition DX and the game itself is released as an app in the App Store for iOS devices. Pac-Mania was also re-released as part of the Pac-Man's Arcade Party arcade machine in 2010 for Pac-Man's 30th anniversary. In February 2014 it was included in the Pac-Man Museum on the PlayStation 3, Xbox 360 and PC via Steam. In 2018, it was included in the Pac-Man's Pixel Bash arcade cabinet, along with other Pac-Man, and different Namco games. The game is included in the 2022 compilation title Pac-Man Museum +, released for PC via Steam, PlayStation 4, Xbox One and Nintendo Switch. On December 8, 2022, Pac-Mania was also included as part of the Arcade Archives by Hamster Corporation.

The music from Pac-Man's Park was later used in Pac-Man and the Ghostly Adventures as the "power up" theme for "Pac" (the show's version of Pac-Man). The same theme, along with Block Town's music, was remixed and used in Super Smash Bros. for Nintendo 3DS and Wii U and later Super Smash Bros. Ultimate.

Notes

References

External links

Pac-Mania at the Arcade History database

1987 video games
Acorn Archimedes games
Amiga games
Amstrad CPC games
Arcade video games
Pac-Man arcade games
Commodore 64 games
Maze games
IOS games
MSX2 games
Namco arcade games
Nintendo Entertainment System games
Nintendo Switch games
PlayStation 4 games
Master System games
Sega Genesis games
X68000 games
Tengen (company) games
Unauthorized video games
ZX Spectrum games
Video games developed in Japan
Video games scored by Yuriko Keino
Video games with oblique graphics
Virtual Console games
Zeebo games
Domark games
Multiplayer and single-player video games
TecMagik games
Hamster Corporation games